Tape Decay is a compilation album by Chemlab, released on September 18, 2019 by Armalyte Industries. It contains demo versions of songs from 10 Ton Pressure, Burn Out at the Hydrogen Bar and East Side Militia combined with three previously unreleased tracks from upcoming albums and an unreleased suture titled "Burnout on the East Side".

Track listing

Personnel
Adapted from the Tape Decay liner notes.

Chemlab
 Wade Alin – instruments
 Jason Bazinet – instruments
 Phil DiSiena – instruments
 Jared Louche – vocals, instruments
 Marc Plastic – instruments

Production and design
 Julian Seifert – mastering
 Vlad McNeally – design
 Robert "Nix" Nixon – cover art, illustrations
 Miguel Torres – mastering

Release history

References

External links 
 Tape Decay at Discogs (list of releases)

Chemlab albums
2019 compilation albums